The 1974 Middle Tennessee Blue Raiders football team represented Middle Tennessee State University—as a member of the Ohio Valley Conference (OVC) during the 1974 NCAA Division II football season. Led by fifth-year head coach Bill Peck, the Blue Raiders compiled a record an overall record of 3–8 with a mark of 2–5 in conference play, placing sixth in the OVC. The team's captains were Orsillo, Flippin, and Rohrdanz.

Schedule

References

Middle Tennessee
Middle Tennessee Blue Raiders football seasons
Middle Tennessee Blue Raiders football